The 1987 UK Championship (also known as the 1987 Tennent's UK Championship for sponsorship reasons) was a professional ranking snooker tournament that took place at the Guild Hall in Preston, England. The event started on 13 November 1987 and the televised stages were shown on BBC between 21 and 29 November 1987.

Willie Thorne made UK Championship history, when he became the first player to make a maximum break at the tournament against Tommy Murphy, although it was not televised, as it took place on 17 November.

Steve Davis meanwhile won his sixth and last UK title by defeating Jimmy White 16–14 in a classic match.

Main draw

Final

Century breaks

 147, 122, 108, 107  Willie Thorne
 139  Jimmy White
 137, 100  Tony Meo
 134  Joe Johnson
 133, 107  Cliff Thorburn
 132  John Campbell
 127, 104  Steve James
 126  Nigel Gilbert

 110, 107, 106, 100  Steve Davis
 110, 101, 101  John Parrott
 107  Dene O'Kane
 106  Alex Higgins
 105, 100  Ray Edmonds
 105  Dennis Taylor
 101  Tony Chappel
 100  Graham Cripsey

References

UK Championship (snooker)
UK Championship
UK Championship
British